The golden-rumped flowerpecker (Dicaeum annae) is a species of bird in the family Dicaeidae.
It is endemic to the Lesser Sunda Islands. This species was named in honour of Anna Weber-van Bosse.

Its natural habitat is subtropical or tropical moist lowland forest.

References

golden-rumped flowerpecker
Birds of the Lesser Sunda Islands
Flores Island (Indonesia)
golden-rumped flowerpecker
golden-rumped flowerpecker
Taxonomy articles created by Polbot